Lesbian, gay, bisexual, and transgender (LGBT) individuals in Jordan face legal challenges and discrimination not experienced by non-LGBT persons. However, Jordan remains one of few Arab countries where homosexual conduct is not criminalized.

Same-sex sexual activity was illegal in Jordan under the British Mandate Criminal Code Ordinance (No. 74 of 1936) until 1951 when Jordan drafted its own penal code which did not criminalise homosexuality, after having gained independence in 1946. Homosexual conduct is legal in Jordan. But LGBT people, like their Heterosexual counterparts, displaying public affection can be prosecuted for "disrupting public morality" and most LGBT people face social discrimination not experienced by non-LGBT residents.

Recent reports suggest that although a large number of LGBT citizens are in the closet and often have to lead double lives, a new wave of younger LGBT people are beginning to come out of the closet and are becoming more visible in the country, working to establish a vibrant LGBT community of filmmakers, journalists, writers, artists and other young professionals.

Criminal laws
The British Mandate Criminal Code Ordinance criminalized homosexuality with up to 10 years in prison, until 1951 when Jordan adopted its own penal code that did not criminalize homosexuality.
In 1951, a revision of the Jordanian Criminal Code legalized private, adult, non-commercial, and consensual sodomy, with the age of consent set at 18, regardless of gender and/or sexual orientation.

The Jordanian penal code no longer permits family members to beat or kill a member of their own family whose "illicit" sexuality is interpreted as bringing "dishonor" to the entire family. As of 2013, the newly revised Penal Code makes honor killings, as a legal justification for murder, illegal.

The Jordanian penal code gives the police discretion when it comes to protecting the public peace, which has sometimes been used against gay people organizing social events.

History 
The first time that the Jordanian government made any public statement regarding LGBT rights was at the Fourth World Conference on Women held in 1995. The international conference sought to address women's rights issues on a global scale, and a proposal was made to have the conference formally address the human rights of gay and bisexual women. The Jordanian delegates to the conference helped to defeat the proposal. More recently, the kingdom's United Nations delegates have also opposed efforts to have the United Nations itself support LGBT rights, although this later proposal was eventually adopted by the United Nations.

The Jordanian government also tolerates a few cafes in Amman that are widely considered to be gay friendly.

Books@Cafe opened in 1997 and remains a popular bookstore and cafe for patrons supportive of "creativity, diversity and tolerance". In the twenty-first century, a Jordanian male model, Khalid, publicly came out and has been supportive of a general interest, gay-themed magazine published in Jordan. "Growing up, it was hard for me to find topics, subjects and publications that I could relate to! In my country, most magazines rejected me and my ideas due to my young age at the time, and I felt like an outcast in my own society!" Khalid told soginews.com.

Transgender rights
In 2014, Jordan's Cassation Court, the highest court in Jordan, allowed a transgender woman to change her legal name and sex to female after she brought forth medical reports from Australia. The head of the Jordanian Department of Civil Status and Passports stated that two to three cases of change of sex reach the Department annually, all based on medical reports and court orders.

District courts are responsible for looking at cases of legal sex change in Jordan. The decision is ultimately left to the judge. Normally, the court assigns a medical committee to examine the claimant before making a decision on the case.

Media and press

The Press and Publication Law was amended in 1998 and 2004. The initial document prohibited the depiction or endorsement of "sexual perversion", which may have included homosexuality. The revised edition in 2004 has a few provisions of direct impact on LGBT rights. First, the content ban on "sexual perversion" has been replaced with a general requirement that the press "respect the values of ... the Arab and Islamic nation" and that the press must also avoid encroaching into people's private lives.

In 2007, the first LGBT-themed Jordanian publication My.Kali was launched. A year later, My.Kali started publication online, named after openly gay model Khalid Abdel-Hadi, making major headlines, as it is the first LGBT publication to ever exist in the MENA region, with one of the only faces in the pan-Arab region.

An article for Al Jazeera English titled "Pushing for Sexual Equality in Jordan" stated: "Earlier this year, they published the magazine’s 50th issue, and celebrated the magazine’s seven-year anniversary. Kali is on the cover, hugging a sculpture head, his naked torso covered in white dust. The headline reads: “Tell Me Little White Secrets!”" The article was soon removed by the official site, and pasted on blogs and pages instead, due to the huge stir the article caused at the time. "... an AJ foreign journalist wrote a favourable article two years ago on Jordan's only LGBTI magazine My.Kali Magazine but a day later the article was removed from its website and the journalist severely reprimanded." Journalist Dan Littauer writes on his official Facebook page, regarding Qatar's attempts of hushing local medias, and freedom of the press. The magazine regularly features non-LGBT artists on their covers to promote acceptance among other communities and was the first publication to give many underground and regional artists their first covers like Yasmine Hamdan, lead singer of the band Mashrou' Leila, Hamed Sinno, Alaa Wardi, Zahed Sultan and many more. "Jordan is a very traditional country, and we're considered controversial in Jordan for simply breaking the stereotype and stepping out of norm," Khalid told Egypt Independent.

Events were held in the Jordanian capital Amman on the International Day Against Homophobia, Transphobia and Biphobia in 2014 and 2015, for educational purposes and for the purpose of raising voice for the community and discussing challenges. Many activists and members of the LGBT community and LGBT allies in Jordan attended the events. in the second event held in 2015 American ambassador in Jordan Alice Wells was one of the speakers. The event held in 2015 was published in almost all local media outlets.

Public opinion
According to a 2019 survey by the Arab Barometer, 93% of Jordanians answered no, 7% answered yes, on question: "Should Society Accept Homosexuality?"

According to a 2019 survey conducted by the Arab Barometer, 21% of respondents considered honor killings acceptable, compared to 7% who accepted homosexuality.

Summary table

See also
Human rights in Jordan
LGBT rights in the Middle East
LGBT rights in Asia

References

LGBT in Jordan
Human rights in Jordan
Jordan
Jordan
Jordan